Stevan Sremac (11 November 1855 – 13 August 1906) was a Serbian realist and comedy writer. He is considered one of the best truly humorous Serbian writers.

Biography

Stevan Sremac was born in Senta in Bačka region (then part of the Austrian Voivodeship of Serbia and Banat of Temeschwar) on 11 November 1855. He was of Aromanian ancestry. He spent his early childhood in the city of his birth, and moved to Belgrade to study after his parents died. While still a university student, he joined the Serbian Army and participated in the 1876 and 1877–1878 wars as a volunteer. In 1878 he graduated from Belgrade's Grande École (Velika škola) in philosophy and history. He became a teacher, working in this profession for the rest of his life—in the southern Serbia's cities of Pirot, Niš and Belgrade. His personal relations with his pupils were of singularly close and affectionate nature, and the charm of his social gifts and genial character won him friends on all sides. His literary reputation was established relatively late, in 1890, with novelized chronicles of events and personages from Serbian history. These weren't published until 1903 under title Iz knjiga starostavnih ("From Ancient Books").

In political sense, he was an activist of Liberal party (Serbia), which was pretty conservative with strong nationalist sentiments and supported the rule of the Obrenović dynasty.

Sremac died accidentally of blood poisoning in Sokobanja on 12 August 1906.

Literary work
Sremac's period spent in Niš was his most productive period. During this period, he published Božićna pečenica (1893), Ivkova slava (1895), Vukadin (1903), Limunacija na selu (1896), Pop Ćira i pop Spira (1898), Čiča Jordan (1903), and Zona Zamfirova (1906), all characterized with local colouring, realism, humour, and satire. Because of their high dramatic quality, many of these were later dramatized, with Ivkova slava, being the most successful. Sremac's characters are usually small merchants, clerks, priests, artists, and just simple folk in small Serbian towns. A realist and sharp observer, he was able to point out the changes sweeping Serbian society into a new era. Some of his stories dealing with vanishing way of life that had persisted for centuries have an unforegetable nostalgic flavor. His depiction of the patriarchal atmosphere of Serbia of his time is done in a humorous vain, but never mockingly, except when he ridicules his political opponents. Sremac's short stories reveal his love for the slowly disappearing "old way" of life. The plots are placed in his native Vojvodina, Bačka in particular, Belgrade, and mostly, southern parts of Serbia. But it is his humor for which Sremac is best known and remembered.

Legacy

Many of his works were turned into films; his most popular novel Pop Ćira i pop Spira was made into TV series in 1980s, while feature films Zona Zamfirova (2002) and Ivkova slava (2005), both by director Zdravko Šotra saw huge success in Serbia and Montenegro.

He is included in The 100 most prominent Serbs.

Selected works
Božićna pečenica (Christmas Roast) (1893)
Ivkova slava (Ivko's slava) (1895)
Limunacija na selu (Illemonation in the Village) (1896)
Pop Ćira i pop Spira (Priest Ćira and Priest Spira) (1898)
Iz knjiga starostavnih (From Ancient Books) (1903—1909).
Vukadin (1903)
Čiča Jordan (Uncle Yordan) (1903)
Zona Zamfirova (1906)

See also
 Serbian literature

References

Jovan Skerlić, Istorija Nove Srpske Književnosti /  A History of New Serbian Literature (Belgrade, 1914, 1921), pages 397–403.

1855 births
1906 deaths
People from Senta
Serbs of Vojvodina
Serbian writers
Serbian novelists
Serbian people of Aromanian descent
Members of the Serbian Academy of Sciences and Arts
Belgrade Higher School alumni
19th-century novelists
Burials at Belgrade New Cemetery